Maritime Security Agency can refer to:
 Indonesian Maritime Security Agency
 Pakistan Maritime Security Agency